Thomas Baines (1820–1875) was an English artist and explorer.

Thomas Baines may also refer to:

Thomas Baines (physician) (1622–1680), English physician
Thomas Baines (journalist) (1806–1881), English journalist and historian
Thomas Baines (Ontario) (1799–1867)

See also
Thomas Bain (disambiguation)